Ralph Tyndall Squire (10 September 1863 – 22 August 1944) was an English footballer who earned three caps for the national team in 1886. Squire played club football for Cambridge University and Corinthian. Squire was educated at Westminster School and Trinity Hall, Cambridge.

References

External links

1863 births
Footballers from Marylebone
1944 deaths
English footballers
England international footballers
Cambridge University A.F.C. players
Corinthian F.C. players
Alumni of Trinity Hall, Cambridge
People educated at Westminster School, London
Association football midfielders